The 1886 British Columbia general election was held in 1886.  The number of members was increased for this election from 25 to 27, and the number of ridings increased to 13.

Each voter was allowed to cast as many votes as there were seats to fill in the district.

The first Labour MLA in BC's history was elected in this election.

Political context

Issues and debates

Non-party system 

There were to be no political parties in the new province.  The designations "Government" and "Opposition" and "Independent" (and variations on these) functioned in place of parties, but they were very loose and do not represent formal coalitions, more alignments of support during the campaign.  "Government" meant in support of the current Premier; "Opposition" meant campaigning against him, and often enough the Opposition would win and immediately become the Government.

The Smithe, A.E.B. Davie, Robson and T. Davie governments

The election mandated the government of William Smithe who had assumed power from the failure of Robert Beaven's government in January 1883.  In May 1887 Smithe died in office and Alexander Edmund Batson Davie assumed power, although due to his own illness he was unable to attend the opening of the Legislature.  When Davie died in 1889 a further change of government saw newspaperman John Robson become Premier that year, receiving a mandate in the 1890 election only to die himself in 1892 of blood poisoning from a cut suffered from the door of a carriage.  He was succeeded by Theodore Davie, who was Premier going into the 1894 election

Byelections not shown

Any changes due to byelections are shown below the main table showing the theoretical composition of the House after the election.  A final table showing the composition of the House at the dissolution of the Legislature at the end of this Parliament can be found below the byelections.  The main table represents the immediate results of the election only, not changes in governing coalitions or eventual changes due to byelections.

List of ridings

The original ridings were thirteen in number, and Cowichan was restored to a two-member seat while New Westminster was increased to three, with the new total being 27 members.  There were no political parties were not acceptable in the House by convention, though some members were openly partisan at the federal level (usually Conservative, although both Liberal and Labour allegiance were on display by some candidates).

These ridings were:

Cariboo (three members)
Cassiar  (one member)
Comox  (one member)
Cowichan (two members)
Esquimalt (two members)
Kootenay (two members)
Lillooet (two members)
Nanaimo   (one member)
New Westminster (three members)
New Westminster City   (one member)
Victoria (two members)
Victoria City (four members)
Yale (three members)

Polling conditions

Natives (First Nations) and Chinese were disallowed from voting, although naturalized Kanakas (Hawaiian colonists) and American and West Indian blacks and certain others participated.  The requirement that knowledge of English be spoken for balloting was discussed but not applied.

Results by riding 

|-
||    
|align="center"|Robert McLeese
|align="center" rowspan=2 |CaribooGovernment
||    
||    
|align="center" |CaribooOpposition
|align="center"|George Cowan
||    
|-
||    
|align="center"|Joseph Mason
||    
||    
|align="center"  |CassiarOpposition
|align="center"|John Grant
||    
|-
||    
|align="center"|Henry Croft
|align="center" rowspan=2 |CowichanGovernment
||    
||    
|align="center"  |ComoxOpposition
|align="center"|Anthony Maitland Stenhouse
||    
|-
||    
|align="center"|William Smithe 1
||    
||    
|align="center" rowspan=2 |New WestminsterOpposition
|align="center"|William Henry Ladner
||    
|-
||    
|align="center"|David Williams Higgins
|align="center" rowspan=2 |EsquimaltGovernment
||    
||    
|align="center"|James Orr
||    
|-
||    
|align="center"|Charles Edward Pooley
||    
||    
|align="center" |New Westminster CityOpposition
|align="center"|William Norman Bole
||    
|-
|-
||    
|align="center"|James Baker
|align="center" |KootenayGovernment
||    
||    
|align="center"  |Victoria CityOpposition
|align="center"|Robert Beaven
||    
|-
||    
|align="center"|Edward Allen
|align="center" rowspan=2 |LillooetGovernment
||    
||    
|align="center"  |YaleOpposition
|align="center"|Charles Augustus Semlin
||    
|-
||    
|align="center"|Alexander Edmund Batson Davie
||    
|-
||    
|align="center"|Robert Dunsmuir
|align="center" rowspan=2 |NanaimoGovernment
||    
|-
||    
|align="center"|William Raybould
||    
|-
||    
|align="center"|John Robson
|align="center" rowspan= |New WestminsterGovernment
||    
|-
||    
|align="center"|George William Anderson
|align="center" rowspan=2 |VictoriaGovernment
||    
|-
||    
|align="center"|Robert Franklin John
||    
|-
||    
|align="center"|Theodore Davie
|align="center" rowspan=3 |Victoria CityGovernment
||    
|-
||    
|align="center"|Edward Gawler Prior
||    
|-
||    
|align="center"|John Herbert Turner
||    
|-
||    
|align="center"|George Bohun Martin
|align="center" rowspan=3 |YaleGovernment
||    
|-
||    
|align="center"|Forbes George Vernon 
||    
|-
|
|-
|
|align-left"|1 Premier-Elect and Incumbent Premier
|-
| align="center" colspan="10"|Source: Elections BC
|-
|}

See also 

List of British Columbia political parties

Further reading & references

In the Sea of Sterile Mountains: The Chinese in British Columbia, Joseph Morton, J.J. Douglas, Vancouver (1974).  Despite its title, a fairly thorough account of the politicians and electoral politics in early BC.

1886
1886 elections in Canada
1886 in British Columbia